General Lord Alexander George Russell  (16 September 1821 – 10 January 1907) was a British Army general. He served during the Siege of Sevastapol in the Crimean War.

Background
Russell was born at Woburn, Bedfordshire, the son of John Russell, 6th Duke of Bedford and his second wife, Lady Georgina (or Georgiana) Gordon, daughter of Alexander Gordon, 4th Duke of Gordon, although it has been claimed that Russell's father was actually the Victorian painter Sir Edwin Landseer, who conducted a lengthy affair with the Duchess of Bedford. He was the half-brother of Francis Russell, 7th Duke of Bedford, Lord George Russell and John Russell, 1st Earl Russell and the full brother of Lord Edward Russell and Lord Charles Russell.

Military career
Russell joined the Army on 11 July 1839 when he purchased a commission as a Second Lieutenant in the Rifle Brigade. Russell was a Colonel in the Rifle Brigade and served during the Siege of Sevastapol in the Crimean War. He became General Officer Commanding South-Eastern District in April 1877 and Commander of the British Troops in Canada in May 1883 and was advanced to Knight Grand Cross of the Order of the Bath (GCB), having previously been a Companion of the Order of the Bath (CB). He was not however styled Sir Alexander Russell since he already held the higher title of Lord due to his father being first a Marquess and later a Duke.

Life
Russell married Anne Emily Worsley Holmes, daughter of Sir Leonard Worsley Holmes, 9th Baronet, on 3 July 1844. They had two children:

 Alexander Gordon Russell (11 July 1854 – 4 June 1917); became a captain in the British Army.
 Leonard George Russell (6 June 1858 – 7 April 1946); became a major in the British Army.

Lady Alexander Russell died in October 1906. Russell only survived her by three months and died at Woodeaton, Oxfordshire, in January 1907, aged 85. She is buried with her husband in the churchyard of St Michael's, Chenies.

Ancestry

References

|-

1821 births
1907 deaths
Knights Grand Cross of the Order of the Bath
British Army generals
British Army personnel of the Crimean War
Younger sons of dukes
King's Regiment (Liverpool) officers
Rifle Brigade officers
People from Woburn, Bedfordshire
Recipients of the Order of the Medjidie
Alexander
A
Military personnel from Bedfordshire